The 2007 Arkansas State Indians football team represented Arkansas State University as a member of the Sun Belt Conference the 2007 NCAA Division I FBS football season. Led by sixth-year head coach Steve Roberts, the Indians compiled an overall record of 5–7 with a mark of 3–4 in conference play, tying for fifth place in the Sun Belt. Arkansas State's offense scored 291 points while the defense allowed 331 points.

Schedule

References

Arkansas State
Arkansas State Red Wolves football seasons
Arkansas State Indians football